(Polish: ,) also known as  (Polish: ,) is a -long river in Frýdek-Místek District, Moravian-Silesian Region, Czech Republic, in the historical region of Cieszyn Silesia.

It is the left tributary of the Olza River, to which it enters in Jablunkov (Jabłonków). It originates near the border with Slovakia and flows through the villages of Horní Lomná (Łomna Górna), Dolní Lomná (Łomna Dolna) and Bocanovice (Boconowice).

It was mentioned in 1592 as przi rzece Lomny. The name is derived from the words łom (clatter, rumble, susurrus) or załom (turn, bend).

Footnotes

References 
 

Rivers of the Moravian-Silesian Region
Moravian-Silesian Beskids
Frýdek-Místek District
Cieszyn Silesia